Thomas Adam Brady is an American writer, film director and producer.

Career
Brady was raised in New Jersey. He began writing and acting during high school, earning him a scholarship to Harvard College. At Harvard, where he graduated in 1986 with a B.A. in English Literature, Brady acted in and directed various theater productions, and began writing his own plays and screenplays. Afterwards, he attended the theater department of the University of Hawaiʻi to get a Master of Fine Arts - Directing.

After being invited to work for Mike Reiss and Al Jean, Brady went on to write and produce episodes of The Critic and The Simpsons, which he would follow with other television work such as Home Improvement, Men Behaving Badly, Sports Night, and Good Vibes.  Film credits include The Animal, The Hot Chick, The Comebacks, and Bucky Larson: Born to Be a Star. Tom is Executive Producer of the FX television  series Chozen.

References

External links

Year of birth missing (living people)
Living people
Harvard College alumni
University of Hawaiʻi at Mānoa alumni
Writers from Bayonne, New Jersey
Film directors from New Jersey